Cameron Riley Monaghan (born ) is an American actor and model. He is known for his role as Ian Gallagher on the Showtime comedy-drama series Shameless and as twins Jerome and Jeremiah Valeska, who serve as origins for the Joker, on the DC Comics-based TV series Gotham. He also portrayed Cal Kestis in the action-adventure game Star Wars Jedi: Fallen Order. Monaghan began his career as a child model at the age of three and as a child actor at the age of seven.

Early life
Monaghan was born in Santa Monica, California, the only child of Diane Monaghan, an insurance claims specialist and single mother. He and his mother relocated to Boca Raton, Florida, shortly after his birth. Recognizing that Monaghan was an exceptionally outgoing child, his mother sent his picture to modeling agencies when he was three. He appeared on the cover of his first catalogue at the age of five and appeared in his first regional commercial at seven.

He attended Addison Mizner Elementary School and began to develop his acting skills by appearing in the Little Palm Children's Theatre's productions of Stuart Little, Winnie-the-Pooh, and The Pumpkin King (a theatrical adaptation of The Nightmare Before Christmas), as well as appearing as Alex in the small independent film The Wishing Stone, which was filmed in the Lake Worth, Florida area.

Career

Early career
Monaghan first came to national attention in 2003 for his role as Winthrop Paroo in the ABC television adaptation of The Music Man. When recounting the decision to cast the 9-year-old Monaghan, director and executive producer Jeff Bleckner explained, "There are some people, when you put them up on film, they sort of pop off the screen at you. That's how it was with Cameron. From the second we saw him, he was it. We were looking for anybody who had that wonderful appeal. And Cameron had it."

In 2004, Monaghan began a recurring role as Chad, one of Dewey's classmates on the Fox comedy series Malcolm in the Middle, which earned him the Young Artist Award as Best Young Television Actor in a Recurring Role. The following year, he began a recurring role as Palmer Noid on the Nickelodeon situation comedy Ned's Declassified School Survival Guide. Subsequent guest-starring television roles followed, including appearances on Criminal Minds, Numbers, The Mentalist, Monk, Three Rivers, Fringe, The Glades, and Terriers.

In 2005, Monaghan transitioned to theatrical film roles, appearing as Timmy in the independent western Brothers in Arms. The following year, he appeared as Kevin O'Doyle, the bothersome next-door neighbor in the fantasy comedy Click. A series of subsequent feature film roles followed, including appearances in The Santa Clause 3: The Escape Clause, Dog Gone, Safe Harbor and Another Harvest Moon, as well as portraying the boy detective Bob Andrews in the Three Investigators film series.

Shameless

In April 2010, Monaghan was cast as an ensemble cast member on the Showtime comedy-drama series Shameless. On the series, which premiered in January 2011, Monaghan portrays Ian Gallagher, the gay bipolar teenage son of a large dysfunctional Chicago family. Sarah Hughes of The Independent commended Monaghan's portrayal for providing "one of the more nuanced depictions of a gay teenager to be seen on US TV." Matthew Gilbert of The Boston Globe described Monaghan's performance as "extraordinary." And the gay-interest media outlet AfterElton.com cited Monaghan's portrayal of Ian in naming him to its list of "2011's Break-Out TV Actors". In February 2014, Showtime announced it had renewed the series for a fifth season, scheduled to begin airing in 2015. For his work in the fifth season, Monaghan received a Critic's Choice Award nomination for Best Supporting Actor in a Comedy Series. The seventh season began airing in October 2016. The eighth season, consisting of 12 episodes, went into production in May 2017; it premiered on November 5, 2017. The series was renewed for a ninth season which premiered on September 9, 2018. Monaghan announced via Instagram that he would be leaving the series following the sixth episode of the ninth season. However, Cameron returned for the tenth season which premiered in late 2019.

2011 to present
Monaghan appears in a variety of episodic television roles. In 2011, he guest-starred as Nick Peyton, a teenage boy accused of murdering his Marine father, on the CBS crime series NCIS. That same year he appeared as Jonathan McKenna on the TNT mystery series Rizzoli & Isles. In 2012, he guest-starred as Eddie Sandow, a 19-year-old who creates a hostage situation after his father is accused of sexual assault, on the NBC crime series Law & Order: Special Victims Unit.

Monaghan also appears in a variety of feature film roles. In 2011, he co-starred as high school sophomore Corey Doyle in the Disney teen drama Prom. In 2012, he portrayed Jake, the son of an attractive YMCA director in the sports themed comedy 2nd Serve. In 2014, Monaghan starred as Adam McCormick, a small-town high school athlete who becomes consumed by the death of one of his classmates in the independent drama Jamie Marks Is Dead. That same year, he appeared as Mason Ashford, the best friend and romantic interest to Rose in the fantasy adventure film Vampire Academy. He also starred as Asher in the dystopian movie The Giver.

From 2015 to 2019, Monaghan was featured as a recurring guest star in all five seasons of Fox's DC Comics-based television series Gotham. He plays the antagonistic twin brothers Jerome and Jeremiah Valeska, who both serve origin stories for the famous Batman villain The Joker.

Monaghan plays Cal Kestis, the player character in the 2019 video game Star Wars Jedi: Fallen Order.

Personal life
Monaghan moved to the Los Angeles area when he was approximately 10 years old.

Filmography

Films

Television

Video games

Web

Awards and nominations

References

External links
 
 
 

1990s births
Living people
21st-century American male actors
American child models
American male child actors
American male film actors
American male television actors
American male video game actors
American male voice actors
Male actors from Santa Monica, California
Male motion capture actors
People from Boca Raton, Florida
People from Greater Los Angeles